Thomas Nieporte (October 21, 1928 – December 21, 2014) was an American professional golfer who played on the PGA Tour in the 1950s and 1960s.

Nieporte grew up in the Cincinnati suburb of North College Hill, Ohio. He attended the Ohio State University and was a distinguished member of the golf team, winning the NCAA Championship in 1951. He was inducted into the Ohio State Varsity O Hall of Fame in 1983.

Nieporte turned pro in 1953.  He played full-time on the PGA Tour for five years, but like most professional golfers of his generation, he spent most of his career earning his living as a club pro. He won three PGA Tour events. The biggest win of his career came in 1967 at the Bob Hope Desert Classic; the Champions Trophy was presented to Nieporte by former President Dwight D. Eisenhower and Bob Hope. His best finish in a major was T5 at the 1964 PGA Championship.

Nieporte co-authored the book "Mind over Golf" with Donald Sauers.

Nieporte was the head pro at Piping Rock Club on Long Island from 1963 to 1978. From 1978 until his retirement in 2006, he was the head pro at Winged Foot Golf Club in Mamaroneck, New York, the site of five U.S. Opens and one PGA Championship. On December 21, 2014, Nieporte died at the age of 86 in Boca Raton, Florida. He was survived by his wife Joan and their nine children.

Amateur wins
1951 NCAA Championship

Professional wins (11)

PGA Tour wins (3)

Other wins (8)
1962 Long Island Open, Long Island PGA Championship
1964 Long Island Open
1965 Long Island Open
1966 Metropolitan Open
1971 Metropolitan PGA Championship
1973 Long Island Open
1975 Long Island Open

References

External links

American male golfers
Ohio State Buckeyes men's golfers
PGA Tour golfers
PGA Tour Champions golfers
Golfers from Ohio
Sportspeople from Cincinnati
People from North College Hill, Ohio
Sportspeople from Boca Raton, Florida 
1928 births
2014 deaths